There are above 180 law schools in Ukraine. Incomplete list of them see below:
 Kharkiv Law Academy
 Odesa Law Academy
 University of Kyiv, law faculty
 Lviv Ivan Franko National University School of Law, 
 Kyiv University of Law
 National University of Ostroh academy, Institute of Law
 Kyiv National University of Trade and Economics, faculty of international trade and law

 
Ukraine
Law
Law of Ukraine
Ukraine education-related lists